Fulgurofusus is a genus of sea snails in the family Columbariidae.

Species
Species within the genus Fulgurofusus include:
 Fulgurofusus atlantis (Clench & Aguayo, 1938)
 Fulgurofusus bartletti (Clench & Aguayo, 1940)
 Fulgurofusus bermudezi (Clench & Aguayo, 1938)
 Fulgurofusus brayi (Clench, 1959)
 Fulgurofusus ecphoroides Harasewych, 1983
 Fulgurofusus electra (F. M. Bayer, 1971)
 Fulgurofusus jonasi J.C. Nascimento de Barros, Ebenezer dos Santos Silva, F. de Almeida Alves-Junior, 2018
 Fulgurofusus marshalli Harasewych, 2011
 Fulgurofusus maxwelli Harasewych, 2011
 Fulgurofusus merope (F. M. Bayer, 1971)
 Fulgurofusus nanshaensis Zhang, 2003
 † Fulgurofusus quercollis (Harris, 1896) 
 Fulgurofusus sarissophorus (Watson, 1882)
 Fulgurofusus tomicici McLean & Andrade, 1982
 Fulgurofusus xenismatis Harasewych, 1983
 Species brought into synonymy 
 Fulgurofusus aequilonius Sysoev, 2000: synonym of Tropidofusus aequilonius (Sysoev, 2000) (original combination)
 Fulgurofusus benthocallis (Melvill & Standen, 1907): synonym of Tropidofusus benthocallis (Melvill & Standen, 1907)
 Fulgurofusus timor Harasewych, 1983 : synonym of  Peristarium timor (Harasewych, 1983)

References

Columbariidae